Adenanthos drummondii is a shrub of the family Proteaceae, native to the south coast of Western Australia. Within the genus Adenanthos, it lies in the section Adenanthos and is most closely related to A. stictus.

drummondii
Eudicots of Western Australia
Garden plants of Australia